The Minister of Regional Development and Local Governments of Latvia was a member of the Cabinet of Ministers of Latvia, and the political leader of the Ministry of Regional Development and Local Governments of Latvia. In 2002, the office was split from the office of the Minister of Environment, and since 2011, merged again.

 
Ministers of Regional Dev